Nanosaur 2: Hatchling (or just Nanosaur 2) is a continuation of the original Nanosaur storyline.  It was released in 2004 by Pangea Software.  Nanosaur 2 is the first stereoscopic game released for the Mac.

Story 
Nanosaur 2 takes place shortly after the original Nanosaur, assuming that it has been completed successfully, when valuable dinosaur eggs are now in the hands of the Nanosaur race. However, an unnamed rebel group of Nanosaurs steal the eggs to create a fighting force against Earth. One Pteranodon egg is left behind, and it is the eponymous hatchling that becomes the player's avatar for the game. The objectives are to recover the lost eggs from the rebel group.

Gameplay 
The objectives are to recover the lost eggs (somehow there are multiples of each type of egg) from the rebel group. The main weapon is a lethal shriek made by said Pteranodon, but there are other weapons which may be found during the course of the game, including a defensive force-field. This game is much larger than the original. There is no time limit. There are three levels rather than one, each with its own layout, music, challenges and environment. The game does not name on what planets the dinosaurs are, although it does state that they are not on Earth. The entire game can be played in 3D using anaglyphic imagery. The environments for each level, in order they are played, follow below.
A redwood forest planet, with no particularly unusual geography. Basic enemies such as dromaeosaurs, brachiosaurs and laser-shooting robots appear in this level. The dromaeosaurs may jump out at your avatar, but the brachiosaurs don't actually attack it, they just lumber around.
A desert planet (pictured), covered with odd crystalline structures, tornadoes and surface lava.
The third and final level is a swamp planet (shown on cheat window) with strange plants and obstacles. These include giant jumping worms, poisonous gases and Rhamphorhynchus, along with the basic enemies.

There is also a multiplayer option for use on the same computer; the software does not support games over the internet. There are six two-player levels and three missions, thus two levels each. The missions are racing, capture the eggs and battle.

Release 
Nanosaur 2 was released for Microsoft Windows PCs. It is published by Ideas from the Deep. Both games were packaged with some new Macintosh computers, like many of Pangea Software's products.  Despite Universal Binaries being released for both titles, Apple has not continued to bundle either title with their new line of Intel-based Macintosh systems. In October 2008, Pangea Software released a port of Nanosaur 2 to the iPhone and iPod Touch. The iOS version featured motion controls and online multiplayer, and lacked local co-op, but was otherwise the same as the Mac version. On December 19, 2022, a free updated and enhanced version was released on Windows, MacOS, and Linux by Iliyas Jorio, with permission from Pangea Software.

Reception

See also 

List of stereoscopic video games
Stereoscopic video game

References

External links 
Nanosaur 2 official website

2004 video games
Dinosaurs in video games
IOS games
MacOS games
Pangea Software
Role-playing video games
Third-person shooters
Video game sequels
Video games developed in the United States
Video games set in the future
Video games with stereoscopic 3D graphics
Windows games